Cludgie is Scots for a place to urinate and defecate.

It may refer to:
 toilet, the room
 toilet, the plumbing fixture
 outhouse